Michael Fish (born 1940) is a British fashion designer famous for designing many of the notable British looks of the 1960s and 1970s, such as the kipper tie.

Career

As a fashion designer
Michael Fish was born in Wood Green, London in 1940. His mother Joan, worked in a chemist shop in Winchmore Hill, his father, Sydney, was an on-course bookmaker. He had one sister, Lesley and a brother named Philip.

Fish was apprenticed in shirtmaking, and by the early 1960s was designing shirts at traditional men's outfitters Turnbull & Asser of Jermyn Street. His designs reflected, and to some extent brought on, the "Peacock Revolution" in men's fashion design, which was a reaction against the dull conservatism of men's dress. His shirts were floral in pattern and often included ruffles and other adornments.  By the middle 1960s, he had opened his own boutique in Mayfair, with Barry Sainsbury, the exclusive establishment was named Mr. Fish, and was situated at 17, Clifford Street.
  
Peculiar to Mr Fish became a fashion icon known for designing flamboyant, attention-getting clothing for notable celebrities of the 1960s and 1970s such as Peter Sellers, Lord Snowdon and David Bowie.

By the middle 1970s, the Mr Fish shop had closed, and he took a job with Sulka in New York, a label famous for its silk foulard dressing gowns. In 1978, he returned to London to work for Jeremy Norman as greeter at the fashionable Embassy Club in Bond Street, the London equivalent of Studio 54.

Mr Fish designs set fashion trends, the kipper tie being one unique example, the polo neck sweater look, which proved a major success in New York and London in the winter of 1967.  Perhaps the most controversial of Fish's designs was the "dress" designed to be worn by men, which was occasionally worn by such rock stars as David Bowie (including on the cover of the album The Man Who Sold the World) and Mick Jagger in the Hyde Park charity concert (including in the film Performance).

In 2004, Fish suffered a ruptured aorta which led to a severe stroke. He has been in a nursing home for the last ten years.

Fish was never married and has no children. His brand has now been purchased by David Mason who is bringing out a range of Mr Fish clothing.

Film work
Fish's designs could be seen in films between the middle 1960s and the early 1970s as well, such as Performance, in which Mick Jagger wears one of Fish's dresses for men. Fish was credited as a costume designer for the Peter Sellers film There's a Girl in My Soup. He also designed the ruffled shirts worn by Jon Pertwee for the duration of his five-year tenure as the Third Doctor on Doctor Who.

Literary references
Jerry Cornelius, Michael Moorcock's fictional poster child for this era, often wore elaborate tailor-made suits by Mr. Fish.

External links 
"The Peculiar ’60s Designer Who Redefined Men’s Fashion", New York Times
"Peacock revolution back with label that dressed Mick Jagger and David Bowie", The Guardian
"Jewish designers to be celebrated in London exhibition" BBC News, 24 January 2023

References 

Fashion designers from London
Living people
1940 births
Menswear designers
British Jews